The Mariner is a Toulouse-based  English-language newspaper, aimed at the university's and city's English-friendly community, which offers both investigative journalism and original creative content.

External links
Official website
The Mariner - The University of Toulouse

Publications established in 2010
English-language newspapers published in France
Mass media in Toulouse
2010 establishments in France
University of Toulouse
Student newspapers